Walter Alvin Tate (July 1, 1918May 8, 1993), was a Major League Baseball pitcher who played in  with the Pittsburgh Pirates. He batted and threw right-handed. Tate had a 0–1 record, with a 5.00 ERA, in two games, in his one-year career.

He was born in Coleman, Oklahoma, and died in Bountiful, Utah.

External links

1918 births
1993 deaths
Pittsburgh Pirates players
Major League Baseball pitchers
Baseball players from Oklahoma
Salt Lake City Bees players
Selma Cloverleafs players
Birmingham Barons players
Albany Senators players
Sacramento Solons players